Neptis paula, or Paula's sailer, is a butterfly in the family Nymphalidae. It is found in Sierra Leone, Liberia, Ivory Coast, Ghana and western Nigeria. The habitat consists of forests.

References

Butterflies described in 1896
paula
Butterflies of Africa
Taxa named by Otto Staudinger